John McEnroe was the defending champion and won the singles title at the 1980 Queen's Club Championships tennis tournament defeating Kim Warwick in the final 6–3, 6–1.

Seeds

  John McEnroe (champion)
  Vitas Gerulaitis (semifinals)
  Harold Solomon (withdrew)
  Roscoe Tanner (quarterfinals)
  Víctor Pecci (semifinals)
  Peter Fleming (first round)
  Pat DuPré (first round)
  Victor Amaya (second round)
  Stan Smith (quarterfinals)
  John Sadri (third round)
  Brian Teacher (second round)
  Tim Gullikson (second round)
  Brian Gottfried (third round)
  Raúl Ramírez (second round)
  Johan Kriek (second round)
  Vijay Amritraj (quarterfinals)

Draw

Finals

Top half

Section 1

Section 2

Bottom half

Section 3

Section 4

References

External links
Official website Queen's Club Championships 
ATP tournament profile

Singles